is a wind farm in the Sōya Hills near the eponymous Cape Sōya in Wakkanai, Hokkaidō, Japan. With fifty-seven turbines each with a capacity of one megawatt, when completed in 2005 it became Japan's largest wind farm, capable of powering approximately 41,000 households and with a theoretical annual emissions reduction of 120,000 tons of CO2 relative to an oil-fired power station of equal capacity. It is one of a complementary network of wind power generation facilities in Wakkanai which together, eight-four turbines in all with a combined total capacity of 106,355 kilowatts, generate approximately 120% of the city's electricity demands. In 2019, with the operator planning to replace the fifty-seven one megawatt turbines with fifteen four megawatt turbines, the Ministry of the Environment raised concerns about the number of bird strikes, in particular those involving white-tailed eagles, Steller's sea eagles, and migrating swans.

See also
 Environmental impact of wind power
 Lake Ōnuma

References

Wakkanai, Hokkaido
Buildings and structures in Hokkaido
Wind farms in Japan
2005 establishments in Japan
Energy infrastructure completed in 2005